A quillon is either of two transverse projections forming a simple crossguard of a sword.

Quillon may also refer to:
Quillón, a commune and city in Chile

See also
Quillion, a fictional crystal from The Sword of Truth series
 Squillion, an example of an indefinite and fictitious number